David Rea may refer to:

 David Rea (politician) (1831–1901), American politician
 David Rea (musician) (1946–2011), American folk musician